Semecarpus cuneiformis is a tree in the cashew and sumac family Anacardiaceae. The specific epithet  is from the Latin meaning "wedge-shaped", referring to the leaf base.

Description

Distribution and habitat
Semecarpus cuneiformis grows naturally in Borneo, the Philippines, Sulawesi, the Lesser Sunda Islands and Taiwan. Its habitat is lowland forests from sea-level to  altitude.

Semecarpus cuneiformis figures in the etiological legend of the community of Krus Na Ligas in Quezon City, Philippines, which is famous for adjoining the campus of the University of the Philippines Diliman.  According to the legend, the earliest settlers of the village noticed that a particular specimen of Semecarpus cuneiformis, known locally as a "Ligas" tree had branches which took the form of a cross.  The highly religious settlers thus named their community after the tree.

References

cuneiformis
Trees of Malesia
Trees of Taiwan
Plants described in 1837
Taxa named by Francisco Manuel Blanco